is a Japanese manga series written and illustrated by Yaso Hanamura. It began serialization in Kodansha's Monthly Morning Two magazine in June 2015. As of January 2020, the series' individual chapters have been collected into five volumes.

Publication
Written and illustrated by Yaso Hanamura, a former animator, the series began serialization in Kodansha's Monthly Morning Two magazine on June 22, 2015. As of January 2020, the series' individual chapters have been collected into five tankōbon volumes.

In December 2018, J-Novel Club announced that they licensed the series for English publication.

Volume list

Reception
Rebecca Silverman from Anime News Network praised the story and illustrations; she felt the story offered a great insight into the anime industry. Demelza from Anime UK News also praised the story and illustrations, favorably comparing the tone to that of Complex Age. Kazuya Masumoto of Studio Trigger felt the story was realistic and recommended the series to anyone interested in seeing how the anime industry works.

References

External links
  
 

Animation making in anime and manga
Drama anime and manga
J-Novel Club books
Kodansha manga
Seinen manga
Slice of life anime and manga